WARV (1590 AM) is a radio station broadcasting a Christian radio format. Licensed to Warwick, Rhode Island, United States, the station serves the Providence area.  The station is owned by Blount Communications, Inc. and features programming from Salem Communications.

Translators

References

External links

ARV
Radio stations established in 1959
Warwick, Rhode Island
1959 establishments in Rhode Island